A list of windmills in Lancashire, including those now within Greater Manchester and Merseyside.

Locations

A – C

F – K

L

M – P

R – W

Notes

Mills in bold text are still standing. Known building dates are also indicated in bold. Text in italics indicates that the information is not confirmed, but is likely to be the case.

Sources

These sources will be useful to expand the article:-

References

Windmills in Lancashire
Lists of windmills in England
Windmills
Windmills in Merseyside